Thomas was Archdeacon of Barnstaple until 1203.

References

Archdeacons of Barnstaple
British Christian clergy